is a Japanese actress and former model. She was an exclusive model for the Japanese Seventeen magazine from late 2003 to mid-2006, and quit modeling when she left the magazine. Her first acting role was Sailor Mars in the Sailor Moon live action show Pretty Guardian Sailor Moon (2003-2004), and after her role in the film Mamiya Kyōdai, she left modeling to concentrate on acting. She has appeared in several films, including The Fast and the Furious: Tokyo Drift (2006) and Handsome Suit (2008), and has played leading roles in the TV Dramas Mop Girl (2007), Homeroom on the Beachside (2008), Buzzer Beat (2009), Lady Saigo no Hanzai Profile (2011), and Akumu-chan (2012).

Biography

Personal life and career
Kitagawa was born on August 22, 1986 in Hyōgo Prefecture, Japan. She grew up in Kobe, and lost many friends in the Great Hanshin earthquake in 1995. As a child, she wanted to be a doctor, but by the time she reached high school she was uncertain of what to do in the future. At around this time, she was scouted by a talent agency, and she decided to try the entertainment world. Her parents were initially opposed, but they gave their permission on two conditions: that she give up if she was making no progress within a year, and that she put her studies first and graduate from university. She graduated from Meiji University in Tokyo in March 2009.

Within a week of joining an agency, Kitagawa had been selected as both a model and an actress. She was chosen as Miss Seventeen 2003, which led to her working as a model with the Japanese Seventeen until she graduated from the magazine in September 2006. In the latter part of the run, she had her own regular feature, "Keiko's Beauty Honey".

As an actress, Kitagawa was given the role of Rei Hino in the live action television series of Sailor Moon, which began her acting career. Her first significant film role was in Mamiya Kyōdai, and as result of the influence of the director, Yoshimitsu Morita, she decided to concentrate on acting rather than modeling. She initially concentrated on films, including the leading roles in Cherry Pie and Dear Friends. In late 2007, she had her first leading role in a TV drama, in the late-night drama Mop Girl. In 2008, she was given the role of the heroine in Homeroom on the Beachside, Fuji Television's Monday 9pm drama for the summer season.

Kitagawa moved to Tokyo when she started working as an actress and model, and has lived there since. She traveled to California for the filming of The Fast and the Furious: Tokyo Drift, and returned there to study English for a couple of months early in 2006. From May to December 2007, she wrote a column entitled "Keytan Hakusho" for the Japanese weekly television listings magazine Weekly The Television.

Kitagawa has described herself as a stay-at-home person who likes watching DVDs, listening to music, and reading books. When asked what she would do if the world was going to end tomorrow, she said "read books". She is managed by Stardust Promotion.

She has appeared in the films Mizu ni Sumu Hana (2006), Mamiya Kyōdai (2006), The Fast and the Furious: Tokyo Drift (2006), Cherry Pie (lead role) (2006), Dear Friends (lead role) (2007), Sono Toki ha Kare ni Yoroshiku (2007), Southbound (2007), Heat Island (2007), Handsome Suit (2008), Orion in Midsummer (2009), I'll Pay (2009), After the Flowers (lead role) (2010),  and Matataki (lead role) (2010), and Elevator to the Scaffold (2010).

She appeared in the TV dramas Pretty Guardian Sailor Moon (2003-4), Mop Girl (lead role) (2007), Homeroom on the Beachside (2008), Buzzer Beat (2009), and Moon Lovers (2010), The After-Dinner Mysteries (2011), Hero (2014), and Detective versus Detectives (2015).

In 2016, Kitagawa married singer-songwriter Daigo. The same year, Kitagawa won the Japanese Television Academy Award for Best Actress for Ie Uru Onna.

On April 22, 2020, she announced her first pregnancy. On September 7, she gave birth to her daughter.

Filmography

Film

Television drama

Documentary
{| class="wikitable sortable"
|-
! Year !! Title !! Network !! class="unsortable" | Notes
|-
|2012
|Kagayaku On'na `Kitagawa Keiko|NHK BS Premium
|
|-
|2013
|Kitagawa Keiko × Chichūkai Megami-tachi o Sagashite
|NHK BS Premium
|in 2 parts
|-
|2014
|Kitagawa Keiko Yuukyuu No Miyako Turkey Istanbul -futari No Kougou Ai No Kiseki Wo Tadoru-
|BS Fuji
|
|-
|2015
|The Premium Kitagawa Keiko Suichoku Time Travel in Rome
|NHK BS Premium
|in 2 parts
|-
|2018
|Iyoiyo start! BS4K BS8K Kaikyoku Special
|NHK 
|Broadcast in Rome
|-
|2019
|Nihon ni koi shita Van Gogh ~ Kitagawa Keiko ga Aruku Tensai Gaka no Tabiji ~'''
|BS Nippon Television
|
|-
|2020
|NHK Special: `Ano Ni~Tsu kara 25-nen Daishinsai no Kodomo-tachi
|NHK
|
|-
|}

 Home Video 
 2013 : Kitagaawa Keiko Making Documentary "27+"  - Documentary

 Radio 
 2006 : Tanabata Nananenkai - As Naomi Setsuraku/Midori Fujikura

Books 
 2006: Stylish Street Book "I've been to Hollywood!" 2007: Kitagawa Keiko Shashinshū Dear Friends 2008: Actress Make Up 2010: Actress Make Up II 2011: Eiga "Paradise Kiss" official murasaki by Kitagawa Keiko Fashion Photo Book 2013: Original 1st shashin-shū 27' (Ni Juna Na) 2015: PARIGOT: Light in the Night in Marunouchi 2016: Keiko Kitagawa 2nd shashin-shū 30 (Angel works) CD 
2004: Sakura Fubuki ("Cherry Blossom Storm")/Hoshi Furu Yoake'' ("Stars Fall at Dawn") (as Rei Hino)

Awards 
2008: 55th The Television Drama Academy Awards: Special Award
2015: 39th Elan d'or Awards: Newcomer of the Year

References

External links

 Official agency profile
 English translation of blog
 

1986 births
Japanese film actresses
Japanese television actresses
Japanese female models
Living people
Actors from Kobe
Meiji University alumni
Stardust Promotion artists
21st-century Japanese actresses